LE or le may refer to:

Businesses

 Le.com (Leshi Internet or Le), a Chinese technology company
 LeEco (Leshi Technology or LE), a former Chinese technology company

Government and military
 Law enforcement, umbrella term for police, courts and prisons
 French Foreign Legion

People
 Lê (surname), a Vietnamese surname
 Le (surname), the romanization of several Chinese surnames
 Lê (footballer, born 1979), Leandro Cesar de Sousa, Brazilian defensive midfielder
 Lê (footballer, born 1984), Leonardo Hermes Lau, Brazilian attacking midfielder
 LE (rapper) (born 1991), South Korean music artist and dancer

Places
 LE postcode area, Leicester, United Kingdom
 Province of Lecce (ISO 3166-2:IT code LE), Italy
 London Eye, a ferris wheel on the Thames

Science and technology

Chemistry and physics
 Lattice energy, the energy of formation of a crystal from infinitely-separated ions
 Lewis number, a dimensionless number ratio in physics
 Ligand efficiency, a measure of the binding energy of a ligand to its binding partner

Computing
 Linear Executable, an OS/2 file format
 LE (text editor), a simple text editor for unix-like operating systems
 Let's Encrypt, a non-profit certification authority
 Little-endian, a system that stores the least-significant byte at the smallest address

Other uses in science
 Lunar eclipse, in astronomy
 Lupus erythematosus, autoimmune diseases

Transportation
 Abellio Greater Anglia (National Rail code: LE), a British train operating company
 Level (airline) (IATA designation: LE)
 Limited edition, a naming designator for automobiles
 Long Éireannach (LÉ), ship prefix for Irish naval vessels
 Luxury edition, another naming designator for high-end automobiles

Other uses
 Egyptian pound, the currency of Egypt
 Le, a la♯ musical note in the solfège solmization

See also

 Lee (disambiguation)
 Leah (disambiguation)
 Leh (disambiguation)